The large-billed lark or southern thick-billed lark (Galerida magnirostris) is a small passerine bird found in southern Africa. The name "large-billed lark" may also refer to Bradfield's lark. The name "thick-billed lark" more commonly refers to the species of the same name (i.e. Rhamphocoris clotbey).

Taxonomy and systematics
The large-billed lark was originally placed in the genus Alauda, and then Calendula until that genus was subsequently re-named to the present Galerida. Another alternate name used for the large-billed lark is the long-billed lark.

Subspecies 
Three subspecies are recognized: 
 G. m. magnirostris (Stephens, 1826): Found in south-western South Africa
 G. m. sedentaria Clancey, 1993: Found in south-western Namibia and western South Africa
 Orange Free State large-billed lark, G. m. harei (Roberts, 1924): Found in central South Africa, Lesotho

Description
The large-billed lark is 18 cm in length. It is relatively short-tailed and has a thick bill with a yellow base to the lower mandible. It has streaked brown-grey upperparts, and a long white supercilium. Like other species in the genus, it has a crest that can be raised in display or alarm. The underparts are cream-coloured with heavy dark streaking on the breast. The heavy bi-coloured bill distinguishes this species from all other African larks.

The call of this very vocal species is a soft creaking "treeeeleeeeleee".

Distribution and habitat
The large-billed lark is a resident breeder in southern South Africa, Lesotho and southernmost Namibia. Its natural habitat is fynbos, karoo scrub and mountain grassland. The large-billed lark is also found in cultivated and fallow agricultural land.

Behaviour and ecology
Like other larks, the large-billed lark nests on the ground. Its food is seeds and insects, the latter especially in the breeding season.

References

Sinclair, Hockey and Tarboton, SASOL Birds of Southern Africa, 
BirdLife International

External links

Species text - The Atlas of Southern African Birds

large-billed lark
Birds of Southern Africa
large-billed lark